The 18th Dáil was elected at the 1965 general election on 7 April 1965 and met on 21 April 1965. The members of Dáil Éireann, the house of representatives of the Oireachtas (legislature) of Ireland, are known as TDs. The 18th Dáil saw a change of Taoiseach from Seán Lemass to Jack Lynch in November 1966. On 22 May 1969 President Éamon de Valera dissolved the Dáil on the request of Taoiseach Jack Lynch. The 18th Dáil lasted  days.

Composition of the 18th Dáil

Fianna Fáil, denoted with a bullet, formed the 11th Government of Ireland led by Seán Lemass as Taoiseach. In 1966, Lemass resigned as Fianna Fáil leader and Taoiseach, to be succeeded by Jack Lynch, who formed the 12th Government of Ireland.

Graphical representation
This is a graphical comparison of party strengths in the 18th Dáil from April 1965. This was not the official seating plan.

Ceann Comhairle
On the meeting of the Dáil, Patrick Hogan (Lab), who had served as Ceann Comhairle since 1951, was proposed by Seán Lemass (FF) and seconded by James Dillon (FG) for the position. His election was approved without a vote.

On 7 November 1967, Hogan retired as Ceann Comhairle. Cormac Breslin (FF), the Leas-Cheann Comhairle, was appointed to the position on a temporary basis. On 14 November, Breslin was proposed by Lemass to the position on a permanent basis. His election was approved without a vote.

TDs by constituency
The list of the 144 TDs elected is given in alphabetical order by Dáil constituency.

Changes

See also
Members of the 11th Seanad

References

External links
Houses of the Oireachtas: Debates: 18th Dáil

 
18
18th Dáil